"Sonnet on the Great Suffering of Jesus Christ" (in Polish ) is a poem by the 17th-century Polish poet Stanisław Herakliusz Lubomirski. The poem is the last in the sequence The Poems of Lent (in Polish ).

Form 
The poem is written in the manner of Italian or Petrarchan sonnet, rhyming abba abba cdc dcd.  It is composed in typical 11-syllable Polish hendecasyllable lines having half-lines of 5 and 6 syllables, separated by a caesura:

 o o o S s || o o o o S s
  o=any syllable; S=stressed syllable; s=unstressed syllable

An interesting feature of the poem is the second quatrain's two extended enumerations using 1-syllable words that are very rare in the Polish language. A similar poetic device was used earlier by another Polish baroque poet, Daniel Naborowski in the poem "The Brevity of Life" (in Polish ).

Translation 
The poem has been translated into English by Michael J. Mikoś.

References 

Polish poems
Sonnets
17th-century poems